Fountain-Fort Carson High School (FFCHS) is a public high school in Fountain, Colorado, United States. It is part of the Fountain-Fort Carson School District 8 and serves Fort Carson in addition to Fountain. It has gained national attention for its close ties to the military, as a large percentage of students live on nearby Fort Carson. Approximately 40% of all students have either one or both parents on active duty in the military. The school's mascot is a Trojan warrior.

Department of Military Science (JROTC)

The JROTC shoulder sleeve insignia and unit insignia are symbols which tie the unit to the school and visually represent the organization.

Notable alumni and former students
 Don Cockroft - former American football placekicker, played for the Cleveland Browns
 Morgan Fox - current American football defensive lineman for the Los Angeles Chargers
 Chase Headley - former professional baseball third baseman, played for the New York Yankees
 Phil Loadholt - former American football offensive tackle, played for the Minnesota Vikings
 Jon Watts - film director, including Spider-Man: Far From Home and Spider-Man: Homecoming

See also 
 El Paso County, Colorado

References

External links 
 

Public high schools in Colorado
Fountain, Colorado
Schools in El Paso County, Colorado